Parastalita is a monotypic genus of Balkan woodlouse hunting spiders containing the single species, Parastalita stygia. It was first described by K. Absolon & J. Kratochvíl in 1932, and has only been found in Bosnia and Herzegovina. Notably, this species is blind as it completely lacks eyes.

References

Dysderidae
Monotypic Araneomorphae genera